The Delitschiaceae are a family of fungi in the order Pleosporales. Taxa are widespread, especially in temperate regions, and are saprobic, often found growing in herbivore dung.

References

Pleosporales
Dothideomycetes families
Taxa named by Margaret Elizabeth Barr-Bigelow
Taxa described in 2000